Extraordinary Popular Delusions and the Madness of Crowds is an early study of crowd psychology by Scottish journalist Charles Mackay, first published in 1841 under the title Memoirs of Extraordinary Popular Delusions. The book was published in three volumes: "National Delusions", "Peculiar Follies", and "Philosophical Delusions". Mackay was an accomplished teller of stories, though he wrote in a journalistic and somewhat sensational style.

The subjects of Mackay's debunking include alchemy, crusades, duels, economic bubbles, fortune-telling, haunted houses, the Drummer of Tedworth, the influence of politics and religion on the shapes of beards and hair, magnetisers (influence of imagination in curing disease), murder through poisoning, prophecies, popular admiration of great thieves, popular follies of great cities, and relics. Present-day writers on economics, such as Michael Lewis and Andrew Tobias, laud the three chapters on economic bubbles.

In later editions, Mackay added a footnote referencing the Railway Mania of the 1840s as another "popular delusion" which was at least as important as the South Sea Bubble. In the 21st century, the mathematician Andrew Odlyzko pointed out, in a published lecture, that Mackay himself played a role in this economic bubble; as a leader writer in The Glasgow Argus, Mackay wrote on 2 October 1845: "There is no reason whatever to fear a crash".

Volume I: National Delusions

Economic bubbles 
The first volume begins with a discussion of three economic bubbles, or financial manias: the South Sea Company bubble of 1711–1720, the Mississippi Company bubble of 1719–1720, and the Dutch tulip mania of the early seventeenth century. According to Mackay, during this bubble, speculators from all walks of life bought and sold tulip bulbs and had even declared futures contracts on them. Allegedly, some tulip bulb varieties briefly became the most expensive objects in the world during 1637. Mackay's accounts are enlivened by colorful, comedic anecdotes, such as the Parisian hunchback who supposedly profited by renting out his hump as a writing desk during the height of the mania surrounding the Mississippi Company.

Two modern researchers, Peter Garber and Anne Goldgar, independently conclude that Mackay greatly exaggerated the scale and effects of the Tulip bubble, and Mike Dash, in his modern popular history of the alleged bubble, notes that he believes the importance and extent of the tulip mania were overstated.

Chapters 
 The Mississippi Scheme
 The South Sea Bubble
 The Tulip Mania
 Relics
 Modern Prophecies
 Popular Admiration for Great Thieves (cf hybristophilia)
 Influence of Politics and Religion on the Hair and Beard
 Duels and Ordeals
 The Love of the Marvellous and the Disbelief of the True
 Popular Follies in Great Cities
 Old Price Riots
 The Thugs, or Phansigars

Volume II: Peculiar Follies

Crusades 

Mackay describes the history of the Crusades as a kind of mania of the Middle Ages, precipitated by the pilgrimages of Europeans to the Holy Land. Mackay is generally unsympathetic to the Crusaders, whom he compares unfavourably to the superior civilisation of Asia: "Europe expended millions of her treasures, and the blood of two millions of her children; and a handful of quarrelsome knights retained possession of Palestine for about one hundred years!"

Witch mania 

Witch trials in 16th- and 17th-century Western Europe are the primary focus of the "Witch Mania" section of the book, which asserts that this was a time when ill fortune was likely to be attributed to supernatural causes. Mackay notes that many of these cases were initiated as a way of settling scores among neighbors or associates, and that extremely low standards of evidence were applied to most of these trials. Mackay claims that "thousands upon thousands" of people were executed as witches over two and a half centuries, with the largest numbers killed in Germany.

Sections 
 The Crusades
 The Witch Mania
 The Slow Poisoners
 Haunted Houses

Volume III: Philosophical Delusions

Alchemists 

The section on alchemysts focuses primarily on efforts to turn base metals into gold. Mackay notes that many of these practitioners were themselves deluded, convinced that these feats could be performed if they discovered the correct old recipe or stumbled upon the right combination of ingredients. Although alchemists gained money from their sponsors, mainly noblemen, he notes that the belief in alchemy by sponsors could be hazardous to its practitioners, as it wasn't rare for an unscrupulous noble to imprison a supposed alchemist until he could produce gold.

Books 
 Book I: The Alchemysts
 Book II: Fortune Telling
 Book III: The Magnetisers

Influence and modern responses 
The book remains in print, and writers continue to discuss its influence, particularly the section on financial bubbles. (See Goldsmith and Lewis, below.)
 Financier Bernard Baruch credited the lessons he learned from Extraordinary Popular Delusions and the Madness of Crowds with his decision to sell all of his stock ahead of the Wall Street Crash of 1929.
 Kurt Vonnegut's seminal novel, Slaughterhouse-Five, references the book.
 The book was the initial inspiration for Richard Condie's National Film Board of Canada animated short film John Law and the Mississippi Bubble (1978).
 Forbes magazine compared Mackay's descriptions of financial bubbles to the Chinese stock bubble of 2007, claiming that the "emotional feedback loop" that drove the Chinese market was very similar to what Mackay described.
 Neil Gaiman borrows from the title in an issue of his popular comic series, The Sandman, in a story featuring a writer whose novel is titled "... And the Madness of Crowds".
 Author and executive coach Marshall Goldsmith discussed the book in depth in BusinessWeek, drawing extensive parallels between the financial bubbles Mackay wrote about and financial bubbles today. Other writers also frequently point to the book to explain recent financial bubbles.
 Financial writer Michael Lewis includes the financial mania chapters in his book The Real Price of Everything: Rediscovering the Six Classics of Economics as one of the six great works of economics, along with writings by Adam Smith, Thomas Robert Malthus, David Ricardo, Thorstein Veblen, and John Maynard Keynes.
 Author and journalist Will Self writes a column for New Statesman, "Madness of Crowds", which Self says takes its title from Mackay's book.
 James Surowiecki, in The Wisdom of Crowds (2004), takes a different view of crowd behavior, saying that under certain circumstances, crowds or groups may have better information and make better decisions than even the best-informed individual.
 Canadian author Louise Penny used MacKay as an inspiration for her 2021 novel "The Madness of Crowds."
 American synthpop band Information Society released a song titled after the book in 2021. Its vocals are mostly samples of cult leader Jim Jones.

See also 
 Crowd psychology
 Economic bubble
 Groupthink
 Irrational exuberance
 Moral panic
 Pseudodoxia Epidemica

Notes

References

External links 

The book is in the public domain and is available online from a number of sources:
 
 
 
 
 

1841 books
Books about crowd psychology
Books about social psychology
History of mental health in the United Kingdom
Economic bubbles
Works by Scottish people
1841 in Scotland
Mass psychogenic illness